The Economic Crime (Transparency and Enforcement) Act 2022 is an Act of Parliament of the United Kingdom, which expands provisions in relation to sanctions and financial crime, that was fast-tracked through Parliament in response to the 2022 Russian invasion of Ukraine.

Background 
During the 2022 Russian invasion of Ukraine, British law enforcement agencies and transparency campaigners raised concerns about the property market of the United Kingdom being used by criminal organisations and corrupt individuals to commit financial crimes.

Passage 
The Economic Crime (Transparency and Enforcement) Bill was formally introduced to the House of Commons of the United Kingdom as a government bill on 1 March 2022. The bill was debated and entered a Committee of the Whole House on 7 March.

Following its passage through the House of Commons, the bill was formally introduced to the House of Lords on 8 March, and was debated the following day. The bill entered committee and received Royal Assent on 14 March.

The Act

Register of Overseas Entities 
Part 1 of the Act sets up a register of overseas entities, which includes information about their beneficial owners (sections 3 to 32), and which makes provisions designed to compel overseas entities to register if they currently own, or wish to own, land in the United Kingdom (sections 33 and 34).

Unexplained Wealth Orders 
Part 2 of the Act sets out provisions relating to unexplained wealth orders.

Sanctions 
Part 3 of the Act contains amendments to the imposition of monetary penalties under the Policing and Crime Act 2017 and amends the UK's sanctions framework under the Sanctions and Anti-Money Laundering Act 2018.

Reception 
The Law Society of England and Wales welcomed the passage of the Act.

See also
List of Acts of the Parliament of the United Kingdom from 2022

References 

2022 in British law
Reactions to the 2022 Russian invasion of Ukraine
United Kingdom Acts of Parliament 2022
Ukraine–United Kingdom relations